Alexandra Adler (24 September 1901 – 4 January 2001) was an Austrian neurologist and the daughter of psychoanalyst Alfred Adler. She has been described as one of the "leading systematizers and interpreters" of Adlerian psychology. Her sister was Socialist activist Valentine Adler. Alexandra Adler's husband was Halfdan Gregersen.

Career
Adler completed her medical studies at the University of Vienna in 1926, and then specialized in psychiatry at the University of Vienna Neuropsychiatric Hospital. She emigrated to the United States in 1935, where she worked as a neurology instructor at the Harvard Medical School. Also in 1935, she established the Journal of Psychology. In 1938, Adler became the medical director of the Alfred Adler Clinic, named after her father. In 1946 she joined New York University College of Medicine's psychiatry department, and became a professor there in 1969. She also served as the president for the American Society of Adlerian Psychology.

Medical Studies 

From 1928 to 1938, Alexandra Adler conducted an investigation of known cases of encephalitis or encephalomyelitis at the Boston City Hospital. The study included over 100 patients. Patients were only admitted if encephalitis was the sole illness of the individual. The aim of the study was to contribute knowledge for these diseases.

In 1937, Adler conducted a study along with the Harvard neurosurgeon Tracy Putnam. The study was conducted on the brain of a patient with multiple sclerosis, resulting in new information on how the disease affected the human body. Illustrations from the study are frequently used in medical literature.

In 1943, Adler studied survivors of the Cocoanut Grove nightclub fire of 1942. The study found that 50% of the survivors still experienced trauma and disturbances a year after the accident. These symptoms included changes in personality such as lack of sleep, anxiety, guilt and fears of the event. It was also found that survivors were only recognizing parts of what happened. It was theorized that this was due to the stress or a possible lesion in the brain due to carbon monoxide exposure. Adler became one of the first neurologists to create a detailed documentation of what is known as post-traumatic stress disorder.

In the 1950s and throughout the 1960's, Adler continued her father's work of Adlerian psychology for possible treatments for schizophrenia, neuroses, and personality disorders. She believed this could be done through modern drug treatment, group therapy, and the existentialist and religious psychotherapies.

Sources

1901 births
2001 deaths
20th-century Austrian Jews
21st-century Austrian Jews
Adler family
Austrian neurologists
Women neurologists
Austrian women neuroscientists
Austrian women psychologists
Jewish women scientists
Austrian women psychiatrists
Jewish psychiatrists
20th-century psychologists